The G.I. movement was the resistance to military involvement in the Vietnam War from active duty soldiers in the United States military.
Within the military popular forms of resistance included combat refusals, fragging, and desertion. By the end of the war at least 450 officers were killed in fraggings, or about 250 from 1969–1971, over 300 refused to engage in combat and approximately 50,000 American servicemen deserted. Along with resistance inside the U.S. military, civilians opened up various G.I. coffeehouses near military bases where civilians could meet with soldiers and could discuss and cooperate in the anti-war movement.

History

Early movement (1964–1967)

The early period of soldier resistance to the Vietnam War involved mainly individual acts of resistance. Some well publicized incidents occurred in this period. The first incident was in November 1965 when Lt. Henry H. Howe, Jr was court martialed for legally participating in  an antiwar demonstration, while off-duty and out of uniform, in El Paso. In 1966, another incident occurred where three soldiers in Fort Hood refused deployment to Vietnam and were reprimanded, gaining the attention of anti-war activists. Later Capt. Howard Levy a dermatologist who would be punished for refusing to train green beret medics being sent to Vietnam.

Growing protests (1968)

In 1968 more collective acts of resistance would take place inside the U.S. military. Many servicemen fled the military and took sanctuary in various churches and universities. Many veterans and servicemen began involving themselves in anti-war marches, and rebellions in military stockades.

At the Presidio of San Francisco a protest was staged by servicemen after another soldier was shot for walking away from a work detail. During the protest a group of AWOL soldiers returned to base to join the demonstration. They were arrested and put into the stockade where they convinced other imprisoned troops to stage another protest.

Later dissent (1969–1972)
Demonstrations inside and outside the army were being conducted by servicemen. More dissident soldiers began to oppose racism felt in the United States, its military, and draft policy. By June 1971, Colonel Robert Heinl declared that the army in Vietnam was "dispirited where not near mutinous" in an article in Armed Forces Journal.

Activist organizations

Civilian assistance organizations 
 Beheiren

Deserters' and veterans' organizations 
 American Deserters Committee
 Vietnam Veterans Against the War

Servicemen's organizations 
 American Servicemen's Union
 Concerned Officers Movement
 GI's Against Fascism
 Movement for a Democratic Military
 Stop Our Ship (SOS)

Gallery

See also
 A Matter of Conscience
 Brian Willson
 Concerned Officers Movement
 Court-martial of Howard Levy
 Donald W. Duncan, Master Sergeant U.S. Army Special Forces early register to the Vietnam War
 Fort Hood Three
 FTA Show
 GI's Against Fascism
 GI Coffeehouses
 GI Underground Press
 Movement for a Democratic Military
 Presidio mutiny
 Resistance Inside the Army
 Opposition to United States involvement in the Vietnam War
 Sir! No Sir!, a documentary about the anti-war movement within the ranks of the United States Armed Forces
 Veterans For Peace
 Vietnam Veterans Against the War
 Waging Peace in Vietnam
 Winter Soldier Investigation
 Dissent by military officers and enlisted personnel

References

Mutinies
Opposition to United States involvement in the Vietnam War
Vietnam War, Protests against the
United States involvement in the Vietnam War
1970s in politics
1960s in politics